The 1987 Cricket World Cup (also known as Reliance World Cup) was the fourth edition of the ICC Cricket World Cup tournament. It was held from October 8 to November 8, 1987, in India and Pakistan — the first held outside England on twenty-one different venues. A total of 27 matches were played in 1987 Cricket World Cup including 2 Semifinals and a Final match.

Umpires
Out of the 12 selected umpires, 4 of them belong to Pakistan, 2 were from England and India each while 1 from Australia, New Zealand, West Indies and Sri Lanka each.
The first semifinal was supervised by Dickie Bird and David Shepherd while Tony Crafter and Steve Woodward supervised the second semifinal.

Ram Gupta and Mahboob Shah were elected to supervise the 1987 Cricket World Cup final.

References

External links

Cricket World Cup 1987 from Cricinfo
Cricket World Cup 1987

Knockout stage
1987 in cricket
1987 in Indian cricket
1987 in Pakistani cricket
1987 in English cricket

mr:१९७५ क्रिकेट विश्वचषक बाद फेरी